The Alberta Elite Hockey League or AEHL (formerly the Alberta Midget Hockey League) is the provincial U18 "AAA" ice hockey league for Alberta, Canada.  The league consists of 17 teams split into the North and South Divisions. League champions go on to compete with the BC Elite Hockey League champions to represent the Pacific at the annual Telus Cup, Canada's national U18 championship. The Calgary Buffaloes are the current league champions. Red Deer is the last AEHL team to win a national title, having won in 2012 & 2013. The current league champions are the Calgary Buffaloes

Current teams

North Division
Canadian (CAC) Gregg Distributors (Edmonton)
Fort Saskatchewan Straightline Dodge Rangers
Grande Peace Ernie's Sports Storm (Grande Prairie)
Leduc Wilhauk Jerky Oil Kings
Lloydminster Inland Steel Bobcats 
Maple Leaf (MLAC) Beverly Optimists (Edmonton)
St. Albert Nektar Raiders
Sherwood Park Ennis Kings
South Side (SSAC) BP Athletics (Edmonton)

South Division
Airdrie CFR Bisons
Calgary Buffaloes
Calgary (NW) Flames
Calgary Northstars
Calgary Royals
Lethbridge Hurricanes
Okotoks Bow Mark Oilers
Red Deer Optimist Chiefs

League awards

League champions

Most championships

Telus Cup
The Calgary Northstars (1991 and 2003), Calgary Buffaloes (1989), and Red Deer Optimist Rebels/Chiefs (2012 & 2013), represent the only AMHL teams to have won the national midget title.  The AMHL has represented the Pacific at the tournament every year since 1985, with the exceptions of 1986, 1992, 2007, and 2012, when British Columbian teams won representation.  Alberta has hosted the national championship three times: 1991 in Calgary, 2007 in Red Deer, and 2012 in Leduc.

Alumni
Many players move on from the AEHL to play Junior A or Major Junior in Western Canada.  The league's National Hockey League (NHL) alumni include Jarome Iginla, Dany Heatley, Jason Smith, Trent Hunter, Joffery Lupul, Trevor Linden, Geoff Sanderson, Scottie Upshall, Brian Sutherby, Mike Comrie, Nick Tarnasky, Jonathan Filewich and Bryan McCabe.

See also
Hockey Alberta
Telus Cup
BC Elite Hockey League - U18 AAA

References

External links
 Official web site

Ice hockey leagues in Alberta
Youth ice hockey leagues in Canada